Carlton is a town in the Borough of Gedling, Nottinghamshire, England. It is to the east of Nottingham. The population at the 2011 Census was 6,881. It was an urban district until 1974, whose wards (Carlton Hill, Carlton, Cavendish, Colwick, Gedling, Netherfield, Phoenix and Porchester) had an estimated population of 48,416 in 2015. Owing to the growth of residential, commercial and industrial in the wider Gedling Borough, City of Nottingham, Borough of Broxtowe, Rushcliffe and Ashfield District, as well as the Amber Valley and Borough of Erewash in Derbyshire which have become quite urban around Nottingham, Carlton and Gedling, as well as Netherfield form a contiguous urban area.

History 
In the Domesday Book of 1086, Carlton is referred to as Carentune.

Like other parts of Nottingham, Carlton grew up with the textile industry in the 19th century. It is now mostly residential.

Until 1950, Carlton was part of the Rushcliffe parliamentary constituency. It had its own eponymous constituency from 1950 until 1983, since when it has been in the Gedling constituency. In 1974, Carlton Urban District became part of the newly formed Borough of Gedling.

Geography 
It is close to  Bakersfield, Colwick, Gedling, Mapperley, Netherfield, Sneinton and St Ann's. It is near the River Trent and has an NG4 post code.

Community

The main shopping street is Carlton Hill, which has several shopping chains and smaller shops such as newsagents, chemists, and grocers. Carlton Square, the traditional centre of Carlton is today a shopping centre.

There are numerous areas of grass for children to play on, as the roads tend to be quite busy. The King George V Recreation Ground on Standhill Road is on the site of the former Standhill Brickworks, and includes a large playing field, a skatepark, and a children's playground. Carlton has two leisure centres: Richard Herrod Centre (an indoor bowling centre) on Foxhill Road and Carlton Forum (a swimming pool, gym and all-weather pitches) on Coningswath Road, off Cavendish Road.

Carlton Laundry on Primrose Road is a Grade II listed building by Watson Fothergill. It was built in 1899 as a laundry and dye works.

Transport

Rail
Carlton railway station is on the Nottingham to Lincoln Line.

Buses
Nottingham City Transport
39: Nottingham, Thorneywood, Carlton Valley
24: Nottingham, Carlton Road, Carlton Hill, Westdale Lane
25: Nottingham, Carlton Hill, Westdale Lane, Mapperley, Arnold
25B: Nottingham, Carlton Hill, Westdale Lane, Mapperley 
26: Nottingham, Carlton Hill, Gedling, Burton Joyce, Lowdham, Southwell 
27: Nottingham, Carlton Hill, Carlton 
N27: Nottingham, Sneinton Dale, Carlton Hill, Westdale Lane, Gedling, Mapperley, Woodborough  Road, Nottingham

Nottingham Minibus
N73: Mapperley, Westdale Lane, Carlton Valley, Netherfield, Victoria Retail Park.

Nottingham Community Transport
L73: Victoria Retail Park, Netherfield, Carlton Square, Carlton Tesco, Bakersfield  
L74: Victoria Retail Park, Netherfield, Cavendish Road, Gedling, Carlton Square, Netherfield, Victoria Retail Park

Education
Local schools are Parkdale School, Carlton le Willows Academy, Sherwood Academy and The Carlton Academy.

Carlton Central Primary School was founded in the late 19th century but after a piece of masonry fell one night from the roof into the school assembly area in the 1960s, the school was demolished and the council house and the current Carlton Square were built in its place. A new school had been built on Foxhill Road/Carlton Hill and Carlton Central Primary School was relocated there. The new school had originally been intended to replace the deteriorating St. Paul's School on Carlton Hill. St Paul's was closed in 1983 after many years and attempts to find a new site and financing for a new building were unsuccessful. Carlton Central Primary School is not the only primary school in Carlton. Amongst others, Porchester Junior School (which has recently been extended) is situated at the top of Standhill Road, while Carlton Standhill Infants School is at the opposite end of Standhill Road.

Carlton has a number of pre schools & nurseries including Foxy Creeks Pre School (based in the Richard Herrod Centre, Foxhill Road), Good Foundations Day Nursery on Station Road and Little Owls Day Nursery on First Avenue.

Carlton is home to the Midlands Academy of Dance and Drama (also known as MADD). It is one of the UK's top musical theatre colleges.

Religion
St. Paul's Church, Carlton-in-the-Willows was built by Henry Herbert, 4th Earl of Carnarvon and consecrated in 1885. Located at the bottom of Carlton Hill, off Church Street, it is built in the style of a Roman Basilica and resides in the diocese of Southwell and Nottingham. Carlton Pentecostal Church is located opposite the fire station on Station Road.

Sport

Carlton Town Football Club were champions of Northern Counties East Football League Division One in the 2005–2006 season.  Carlton Forum is a large leisure centre on Coningswath Road.

Notable people
 Richard Beckinsale, actor and father of actresses Samantha Beckinsale and Kate Beckinsale, was born in Carlton in 1947.
 Sam Beeton, chart topping singer/songwriter was born in Carlton in 1988.

References

External links
Leisure centre
Gedling Borough Council
Carlton Pentecostal Church
St John the Baptist Church
St Paul’s Church
Porchester Junior School
The Carlton Academy
Carlton Central Junior School

Towns in Nottinghamshire
Unparished areas in Nottinghamshire
Gedling